Oleg Fedorovych Tverdovsky (born 18 May 1976) is a Russian former professional ice hockey defenceman who played professionally from 1994 to 2013. He played in the National Hockey League (NHL) with the Mighty Ducks of Anaheim, Winnipeg Jets, Phoenix Coyotes, New Jersey Devils, Carolina Hurricanes, and Los Angeles Kings and in the Russian Superleague (RSL)/Kontinental Hockey League (KHL) with Avangard Omsk, Salavat Yulayev Ufa, and Metallurg Magnitogorsk.

Playing career

NHL and Superleague
Tverdovsky was drafted second overall by the Mighty Ducks of Anaheim in the 1994 NHL Entry Draft. Due to the 1994–95 lockout delaying the season, Tverdovsky was assigned to the Brandon Wheat Kings of the Western Hockey League, where he played seven games. When he debuted for the Mighty Ducks, he set a franchise record for being the youngest player to suit up for a game, at 18 years, eight months and 13 days. Despite being considered one of the cornerstones for the young Mighty Ducks franchise, Tverdovsky was traded to the Winnipeg Jets on 7 February 1996 with Chad Kilger and a 1996 third-round pick in exchange for Teemu Selänne, Marc Chouinard and a 1996 fourth-round pick. In 1996, Tverdovsky represented Russia at the World Cup of Hockey.

Tverdovsky's stay in Winnipeg would be short-lived, as the Jets franchise relocated to Phoenix, Arizona and was rebranded as the Phoenix Coyotes. In 1997, Tverdovsky was selected to the All-Star Game representing the Coyotes. While establishing himself as a fixture on the Coyotes blueline for his tenure with the club, Tverdovsky was traded back to the Mighty Ducks at the 1999 NHL Entry Draft in exchange for Travis Green and a 1999 first-round pick (Scott Kelman). In 2002, he represented Russia at the 2002 Winter Olympics.

He was then sent to the Devils in the summer of 2002 along with teammate Jeff Friesen in a seven player trade that sent Petr Sykora to Anaheim. The two teams would battle one another in the 2003 Stanley Cup Finals nearly a year later. Following the 2003 season, Tverdovsky returned to Russia to play in the Russian Superleague with Avangard Omsk. While with Avangard, he won the league championship. Tverdovsky represented Russia at the World Cup of Hockey. He returned to the NHL as a free agent, signing with the Carolina Hurricanes in 2005.

Tverdovsky has won the Stanley Cup twice in his career — once while a member of the New Jersey Devils in 2003 and once as a member of the Hurricanes in 2006. On 29 September 2006, Tverdovsky and Jack Johnson were traded to the Los Angeles Kings in exchange for Éric Bélanger and Tim Gleason.

Return to Russia
Tverdovsky played the 2007–08 season in Russia for Salavat Yulayev Ufa, where he played for the next five seasons. When he left the NHL, Tverdovsky was still under contract with the Los Angeles Kings. This was able to happen because there was no transfer agreement between the NHL and the Russian Hockey Federation.

He was also selected as a reserve by Team Russia for the 2010 Winter Olympics should an injury occur during the tournament.

He was traded to Metallurg Magnitogorsk in the 2011–12 season, and played part of the next season with that club before retiring.

Personal life
Tverdovsky lives with his second wife Mia in the United States. Together they are raising five kids.

Career statistics

Regular season and playoffs

International

Note:
 2010 - Winter Olympics (reserve)

Awards and achievements

References

External links
 

1976 births
Living people
Anaheim Ducks draft picks
Avangard Omsk players
Brandon Wheat Kings players
Carolina Hurricanes players
Hamilton Bulldogs (AHL) players
Ice hockey players at the 2002 Winter Olympics
Krylya Sovetov Moscow players
Los Angeles Kings players
Manchester Monarchs (AHL) players
Medalists at the 2002 Winter Olympics
Metallurg Magnitogorsk players
Mighty Ducks of Anaheim players
National Hockey League All-Stars
National Hockey League first-round draft picks
New Jersey Devils players
Olympic bronze medalists for Russia
Olympic ice hockey players of Russia
Olympic medalists in ice hockey
Phoenix Coyotes players
Russian expatriates in the United States
Russian ice hockey defencemen
Ukrainian emigrants to Russia
Salavat Yulaev Ufa players
Sportspeople from Donetsk
Stanley Cup champions
Winnipeg Jets (1979–1996) players